West Oder is the western arm of the lower Oder near Szczecin, Poland along the border with Germany. It flows into the Oder Lagoon.

The river flows through the Lower Oder Valley forming, along with the Eastern Oder, an area called Międzyodrze, part of the Lower Odra Valley Landscape Park. Międzyodrze area is traversed by a network of canals and old riverbeds, linked with West Oder. Between the split of Odra arms to the Regalica, East Oder runs through the Gryfino County.

See also
 East Oder, or Regalica

References
 Opis Odrzańskiej Drogi Wodnej Zawartej w granicach RZGW Szczecin. Regionalny Zarząd Gospodarki Wodnej w Szczecinie.

Rivers of Poland
Rivers of West Pomeranian Voivodeship
0West Oder